Louis Nzala Kianza (6 February 1946 – 26 November 2020) was a Democratic Republic of the Congo, Roman Catholic bishop.

Nzala Kianza was born in the Democratic Republic of the Congo and was ordained to the priesthood in 1972. He served as bishop of the Roman Catholic Diocese of Popokabaka, Democratic Republic of the Congo from 1996 until his retirement in 2020. He also served as the apostolic administrator of the Roman Catholic Diocese of Idiofa, Democratic Republic of the Congo, from 2006 to 2009.

Notes

1946 births
2020 deaths
20th-century Roman Catholic bishops in the Democratic Republic of the Congo
21st-century Roman Catholic bishops in the Democratic Republic of the Congo
Roman Catholic bishops of Popokabaka
21st-century Democratic Republic of the Congo people